Lindsay Grigg (born May 26, 1993) is a women’s ice hockey player. Having played at the NCAA level with the RIT Tigers women's ice hockey program, she was a member of the Buffalo Beauts of the National Women's Hockey League during the 2015–16 NWHL season, the first in league history. Grigg has also competed for the Canada women's national inline hockey team. For the 2016–17 season, Grigg has signed a contract to play with the HV71 club, part of Sweden's Riksserien league.

Playing career
During the 2010–11 PWHL season, Grigg played for the Oakville Hornets, serving as team captain. Of note, she would also have the honor of the captaincy bestowed upon her during her junior and senior seasons at RIT.

NCAA
With 6:17 left in the second overtime of the 2014 College Hockey American championship game, Grigg scored the game-winning goal, as RIT won their first conference championship in NCAA Division I play, prevailing by a 2–1 tally against the Mercyhurst Lakers.

During her junior season at RIT, Grigg blocked 127 shots, which led the NCAA, setting a new program record. Of note, she would lead the Tigers in scoring during her senior season.

Inline hockey
Grigg joined the Canadian women's senior inline hockey team in 2012, capturing a gold medal at the World Championships. With Canada's inline team, she was their scoring leader at the 2016 Inline World Hockey Championships in Asiago, logging ten points. Of note, she ranked fifth overall among all female competitors

In addition, Grigg served as an assistant coach for the Canadian junior women’s inline hockey team that competed at the FIRS world junior championships in 2014, hosted by France.

Awards and honours
 2014–15 CHA Best Defensive Forward
 2015 CHA All-Tournament Team
 2015 College Hockey America All-Academic honors

Career stats

References

External links
 
 Lindsay Grigg at RIT Tigers
 

1993 births
Buffalo Beauts players
Canadian women's ice hockey defencemen
Canadian women's national inline hockey team players
Living people
Premier Hockey Federation players
RIT Tigers women's ice hockey players